Victor Nwaneri (born 17 February 1993) is a Nigerian footballer who currently plays as a forward for Hatta.

Career statistics

Club

Notes

References

1993 births
Living people
Nigerian footballers
Nigerian expatriate footballers
Association football forwards
Qalali Club players
Hatta Club players
Masfout Club players
Al Urooba Club players
UAE Pro League players
UAE First Division League players
Nigerian expatriate sportspeople in the United Arab Emirates
Nigerian expatriate sportspeople in Bahrain
Expatriate footballers in the United Arab Emirates
Expatriate footballers in Bahrain